A deep-submergence vehicle (DSV) is a deep-diving crewed submersible that is self-propelled. Several navies operate vehicles that can be accurately described as DSVs. DSVs are commonly divided into two types: research DSVs, which are used for exploration and surveying, and DSRVs (Deep Submergence Rescue Vehicle), which are intended to be used for rescuing the crew of a sunken navy submarine, clandestine (espionage) missions (primarily installing wiretaps on undersea communications cables), or both. DSRVs are equipped with docking chambers to allow personnel ingress and egress via a manhole.

Strictly speaking, bathyscaphes are not submarines because they have minimal mobility and are built like a balloon, using a habitable spherical pressure vessel hung under a liquid hydrocarbon filled float drum. In a DSV/DSRV, the passenger compartment and the ballast tank functionality is incorporated into a single structure to afford more habitable space (up to 24 people in the case of a DSRV).
Most DSV/DSRV vehicles are powered by traditional electric battery propulsion and have very limited endurance, while few (like NR-1 or AS-12/31) are/were nuclear-powered, and could sustain much longer missions. Plans have been made to equip DSVs with LOX Stirling engines but none have been realized so far due to cost and maintenance considerations. All DSVs to date (2023) are dependent upon a surface support ship or a mother submarine, that can piggyback or tow them (in case of the NR-1) to the scene of operations. Some DSRV vessels are air transportable in very large military cargo planes to speed up deployment in case of emergency rescue missions.

List of deep submergence vehicles

Trieste-class bathyscaphes
 FNRS-2  The first bathyscaphe, developed by Swiss engineer Auguste Piccard and named after the Belgian Fonds National de la Recherche Scientifique (FNRS), the funding organization for the venture. FNRS also funded the FNRS-1, a balloon that set a world altitude record, also built by Piccard. This bathyscaphe consisted of a gasoline filled float, 22 feet long and 10 feet wide, and oval shaped. Gasoline being less dense than water, would provide buoyancy for when the bathyscaphe needed to rise to the surface. The ovular float was divided into six tanks for holding gasoline, having a combined total of 6,600 gallons.

 FNRS-3  After damage to the FNRS-2 during its sea trials in 1948, the FNRS ran out of funding and the submersible was sold to the French Navy in 1950. It was subsequently substantially rebuilt and improved at Toulon naval base, and renamed FNRS-3. It was relaunched in 1953 under the command of Georges Houot, a French naval officer.

 DSV-0 Trieste  The X-1 Trieste bathyscaphe has reached Challenger Deep, the world's deepest seabed. It was retired in 1966.

 DSV-1 X-2 Trieste II  An updated bathyscaphe design, it participated in clandestine missions. Trieste II was retired in 1984.

Alvin-class submersibles
Alvin operates from R/V Atlantis, an AGOR-23 class vessel owned by the ONR and operated by WHOI under a charter party agreement. The NSF has committed to the construction of a replacement submersible with enhanced capabilities and  depth capability to replace Alvin, which will be retired upon its completion.

Owned by the United States Navy and operated under secondment by the Woods Hole Oceanographic Institution (WHOI) where it conducts science-oriented missions funded by the National Science Foundation (NSF), National Oceanic and Atmospheric Administration (NOAA) and the Office of Naval Research (ONR). Alvin operates from R/V Atlantis, an AGOR-23 class vessel owned by the ONR and operated by WHOI under a charter party agreement. The NSF has committed to the construction of a replacement submersible with enhanced capabilities and  depth capability to replace Alvin, which will be retired upon its completion.
 DSV-3 Turtle  Alvins identical sibling, launched in December 1968 and retired 1998. Owned and operated by the United States Navy.
 DSV-4 Sea Cliff  Another Alvin-class DSV sub, launched in December 1968, retired in 1998, and returned to active service in September 2002.
 DSV-5 Nemo  Another Alvin-class DSV sub, launched in June 1970 and retired in 1998. Owned and operated by the United States Navy.

Star-class DSV
 Star II
 Star III

Both Star II and Star III were built by General Dynamics Electric Boat Division in Groton, Connecticut.  Both were launched on May 3, 1966, and were used for civilian research.

NR-1–class DSVN
 NR-1  a decommissioned US Navy nuclear powered research and clandestine DSV submarine, which could roll on the seabed using large balloon wheels.

Aluminaut
 Aluminaut  a DSV made completely of aluminum by the Reynolds Metals Aluminum Company, for the US Navy, once held the submarine deep diving record. It is no longer operational.

Deepsea Challenger
 Deepsea Challenger  a DSV made by the Acheron Project Pty Ltd, has reached Challenger Deep, the world's deepest seabed.

Limiting Factor 

A submersible commissioned by Caladan Oceanic and designed and built by Triton Submarines of Sebastian, Florida. On December 19, 2018, it was the first crewed submersible to reach the bottom of the Atlantic Ocean, or 8,376 meters in the Brownson Deep, thus making it the deepest diving, currently operational submersible. In August 2019, the submersible and its pilot, Victor Vescovo, completed the "Five Deeps Expedition" with its support ship, the DSSV Pressure Drop, becoming the first submersible to visit the bottom of all five of the world's oceans. Earlier that same month, a team of explorers and scientists used Limiting Factor to visit the wreck of the RMS Titanic in the North Atlantic Ocean. On March 31, 2021, Caladan Oceanic announced having re-located, surveyed, and filmed the wreck of the World War II destroyer , sunk on October 25, 1944, in the Battle off Samar (in the Philippine Sea off Samar Island).

Priz-class DSRV
 Priz  a DSRV class of five ships built by the USSR and Russia. These mini-submarines can ferry up to 20 people for very brief periods of time (in case of a rescue mission) or operate submerged for two to three days with a regular crew of three to four specialists. In early 2005, the Russian AS-28 Priz vessel was trapped undersea and subsequently freed by a British ROV in a successful international rescue effort.

Mir
 Mir  a strictly civilian (research) class of two DSVs which were manufactured in Finland for the USSR. After visiting and filming the RMS Titanic's wreck, the two Mir submersibles and their support ship were loaned to a US Pacific trench surveying mission in the late 1990s and made important discoveries concerning sulphuric based life in "black smokers".

Kalitka-class DSVN
 AS-12  a Russian counterpart to the American NR-1 clandestine nuclear DSV, is a relatively large, deep-diving nuclear submarine of 2,000 tons submerged displacement that is intended for oceanographic research and clandestine missions. Despite the three-month mission time allowed by its nuclear reactor and ample food stores it usually operates in conjunction with a specialized tender, a refurbished Delta III-class submarine BS-136 Orenburg, which has its missile shafts removed and fitted with a special docking cradle on its bottom.

Konsul-class DSV
 Konsul  a class of Russian military DSVs currently deployed onboard the Russian oceanographic research ship Yantar. It is reported that the submersible and its sister sub Rus are used to conduct seafloor surveillance of marine communications cables and western underwater surveillance devices.

Nautile
 Nautile  a DSV owned by Ifremer, the French Research Institute for Exploitation of the Sea.

Shinkai
 DSV Shinkai  JAMSTEC (Japan Agency for Marine-Earth Science and Technology) operates a DSV series called Shinkai ("Deep Sea").

Pisces-class DSV
 Pisces-class DSV  three-person research submersibles built by International Hydrodynamics of Vancouver in British Columbia with a maximum operating depth of  capable of dive durations of 7 to 10 hours. A total of 10 were built and are representative of late 1960s deep-ocean submersible design. Two (Pisces IV and Pisces V) are currently operated by National Oceanic and Atmospheric Administration and the first production vehicle is on display in Vancouver. Pisces VI is undergoing retrofit.

Sea Pole-class bathyscaphe
Bathyscaphe series designed by the People's Republic of China, and there are three derivatives known to exist by 2010:
 Sea Pole-class bathyscaphe  1 built, 2nd unit developed into Jiaolong (Described below)
 Jiaolong-class bathyscaphe  Subclass of Sea Pole class, 1 built.
 Harmony-class bathyscaphe Subclass of  Jiaolong class, 1 built.

Fendouzhe DSV
 Fendouzhe, or Striver-class a Chinese DSV that dove to an estimated depth of 10,909 meters in the Mariana Trench on November 10, 2020, the deepest ever for a Chinese submersible. It was supported by its mother ship, the Tansuo-1 (Exploration-1) and its development began in 2016. The chief designer of the sub, Liu Yeyao, and two other Chinese oceanauts made the descent in what was the first three-person, welded titanium capsule to venture to full ocean depth.

Deep Sea Warrior bathyscaphe
 Deep sea warrior or "Shen-Hai Yong-Shi" developed by China Shipbuilding Industry Corporation in 2017 and capable of diving up to a depth of 4,500 meters.

Ictineu 3

 Ictineu 3  a three-person crewed DSV. The hull is made of inox steel and it has a large  semi-spheric acrylic glass viewport.

Matsya 6000
 Matsya 6000 DSV  an Indian under-development crewed deep-submergence vehicle intended to be utilised for deep sea exploration of rare minerals in the Indian Ocean. It is capable of diving upto a depth of 6,000 m. First uncrewed trial was conducted on 27 October 2021 where the 'personnel sphere' was lowered upto a depth of 600 m, off the coast of Chennai.

Other DSV bathyscaphes
 Bathyscaphe Archimède  French-made bathyscaphe, operated around the time of the Trieste.
 FNRS-4

Deepest explorers
  DSV Limiting Factor11,000 m
  Bathyscaphe Trieste11,000 m
  Deepsea Challenger11,000 m
 Fendouzhe11,000 m
  Archimède9,500 m
 Jiaolong7,000 m
  DSV Shinkai 65006,500 m
  Konsul6,500 m
  DSV Alvin6,500 m
  DSV Sea Cliff6,000m
  MIR6,000 m
  Nautile6,000 m

 Figures rounded to nearest 500 metres

References

External links

 "Deep Submergence Vehicle (S-P)". Naval Vessel Register.
 "Deep Submergence Rescue Vehicle (S-P)". Naval Vessel Register.
 https://web.archive.org/web/20041017224027/http://www.chinfo.navy.mil/navpalib/factfile/ships/ship-dsrv.html
 "Research Vessels and Vehicles". Japan Agency for Marine-Earth Science and Technology.
 "Robot sub reaches deepest ocean". BBC News, 3 June 2009.

 

 
Ship types